The yellow-throated leaflove (Atimastillas flavicollis) is a species of leaflove in the bulbul family of passerine birds. It is the only species of the monotypic genus Atimastillas. The yellow-throated leaflove is found in western and central Africa. Its natural habitats are subtropical or tropical dry forests, moist savanna, and subtropical or tropical moist shrubland.

Taxonomy and systematics
The yellow-throated leaflove was originally described in the genus Haematornis (a synonym for Pycnonotus) and later classified within Chlorocichla before being moved to the genus Atimastillas in 2010. Not all authorities have adopted this latest genus change. Formerly, various authorities have classified the yellow-throated leaflove in several other genera, including Criniger, Ixus and Xenocichla (a synonym for Bleda). Alternatively, some authorities have classified the yellow-throated leaflove as synonymous with the yellow-throated greenbul. Alternate names for the yellow-throated leaflove include the mango bulbul, yellowthroat and yellow-throated greenbul. The alternate name 'yellowthroat' is not to be confused with the species of the genus Geothlypis.

Subspecies
Three subspecies are recognized:
 A. f. flavicollis - (Swainson, 1837): Found from Senegal and Gambia to northern Cameroon and north-western Central African Republic
 Bosum yellow-throated greenbul (A. f. soror) - (Neumann, 1914): Also named the Congo white-throated leaflove. Found from central Cameroon to west-central Ethiopia and central Democratic Republic of the Congo
 Uganda yellow-throated greenbul (A. f. flavigula) - (Cabanis, 1880): Originally described as a separate species in the genus Trichophorus (a synonym for Criniger) and Xenocichla (a synonym for Bleda). Found from Angola, south-eastern Democratic Republic of the Congo to Uganda, western Kenya and western Tanzania

References

yellow-throated leaflove
yellow-throated leaflove
Birds of Sub-Saharan Africa
yellow-throated leaflove
Taxonomy articles created by Polbot